Trevor Pearson (born 4 April 1952) is an English footballer who played for Sheffield Wednesday.

References

1952 births
English footballers
Kiveton Park F.C. players
Sheffield Wednesday F.C. players
English Football League players
Living people
Association football goalkeepers